Aluminium Almahdi Novin Hormozgan Football Club is an Iranian football club based in Hormozgan Province, Iran. They competed in the 2010–11 Iran Football's 3rd Division. They are the reserve team of Aluminium Hormozgan.

Season-by-Season

The table below shows the achievements of the club in various competitions.

See also
 2010-11 Hazfi Cup
 2010–11 Iran Football's 3rd Division

Football clubs in Iran
Association football clubs established in 2009
2009 establishments in Iran